The National Parks and Wildlife Service manages the Irish State's nature conservation responsibilities. As well as managing the national parks, the activities of the NPWS include the designation and protection of Natural Heritage Areas, Special Areas of Conservation and Special Protection Areas.

History
The Service was established as part of the Department of the Environment, Heritage and Local Government after the abolition of Dúchas in 2003. Dúchas's responsibilities had included the management of Ireland's six national parks and wildlife.

In 2011 built and natural heritage came into the remit of the Department of Arts, Heritage and the Gaeltacht as part of a reorganisation of Irish departments. It was transferred again in 2020 to the Department of Housing, Local Government and Heritage.

References

External links
Official website

Environment of the Republic of Ireland
National park administrators
Government agencies established in 2003
Government agencies of the Republic of Ireland
Department of Housing, Local Government and Heritage